The 2020–21 Tottenham Hotspur F.C. Women season was the club's 36th season in existence and their second in the FA Women's Super League, the highest level of the football pyramid. Along with competing in the WSL, the club also contested two domestic cup competitions: the FA Cup and the League Cup.

Josie Green was appointed captain following the retirement of Jenna Schillaci.

Head coaches Karen Hills and Juan Amoros were relieved of their duties on 19 November with the club sat in 11th place in the league. Hills had been in charge of the first team since August 2009 while Spurs were playing in the then-third tier South East Combination Women's Football League. Amoros joined in February 2011. They were replaced by England assistant manager Rehanne Skinner.

Squad

Preseason

FA Women's Super League

Results summary

Results by matchday

Results

League table

Women's FA Cup 

As a member of the top two tiers, Tottenham will enter the FA Cup in the fourth round proper. Originally scheduled to take place on 31 January 2021, it was delayed due to COVID-19 restrictions. Due to the delay, the competition only reached the fifth round before the end of the season. It resumed at the quarter-final stage the following season on 29 September 2021.

FA Women's League Cup

Squad statistics

Appearances 

Starting appearances are listed first, followed by substitute appearances after the + symbol where applicable. Players listed with no appearances have been in the matchday squad but only as unused substitutes.

|-
|colspan="14"|Joined during 2021–22 season but competed in the postponed 2020–21 FA Cup:

|-
|colspan="14"|Players away from the club on loan:

|-
|colspan="14"|Players who appeared for Tottenham Hotspur but left during the season:

|}

Transfers

Transfers in

Loans in

Transfers out

Loans out

References 

Tottenham Hotspur